Synaphea pandurata is a shrub endemic to Western Australia.

It is found on undulating terrain in the Wheatbelt region of Western Australia between Brookton and Wandering where it grows in sandy-loamy soils over laterite or granite.

References

Eudicots of Western Australia
pandurata
Endemic flora of Western Australia
Plants described in 2007